FNM may refer to:

Companies
 Fannie Mae, an American mortgage guarantor
 Fábrica Nacional de Motores, a defunct Brazilian automobile manufacturer
 Fábrica Nacional de Munições de Armas Ligeiras, a defunct Portuguese munitions manufacturer
 Ferrocarriles Nacionales de México, Mexico's national railway company
 Ferrovie Nord Milano, an Italian transport company

Football
 F.C. Nassaji Mazandaran, an Iranian football club in Qa'em Shahr, Mazandaran, Iran
 FC Nika Moscow, a Russian association football club
 FC Nyva Myronivka, a Ukrainian football club from Myronivka, Kyiv Oblast
 FK Nov Milenium, a football club in Sušica near Strumica, Macedonia

Music
 Faith No More, an American alternative metal band
 "Free Nelson Mandela", a 1984 song by The Special A.K.A.

Other
 Fake News Media
 Florence Nightingale Medal, created by the Red Cross
 Florida Naval Militia, a defunct military reserve of the United States Navy
 Free National Movement, a Bahamian political party
 Friday Night Magic, a Magic: The Gathering tournament
 Filem Negara Malaysia, a defunct agency of the government of Malaysia